Lina Puerta (born 1969) is a Colombian-American mixed media artist based in New York City. She was born in New Jersey and grew up in Colombia.

Education
Lina Puerta studied at Institute Lorenzode Medici in Florence, Italy, and earned her BA from Wells College with Honors in Studio Art in 1992. Then she earned her master's degree in Art Education from Queens College in 1998.

Art
Puerta's work covers several mediums, all of which are heavily influenced by materials and their metaphorical significance to the work. She combines jewelry, fabric, paint, buttons, resin, wire, wood, etc. in her sculpture work, exploring the tension between nature and the human-made. Both her sculpture work and her work on paper focus on themes of nature, man made structures, fragility, and the environment in relation to humanity.

Puerta's Botanico Series (2011–2014) is installation based and incorporates Polyurethane resin, wood, foam, paint, fiberfill, fabric, chains, rhinestones, beads, trims, and artificial plants and moss to create natural spaces emerging from a human-made object. These works explore the relationship between nature and control, as these organic, plant-based works burst through their designated locations.

The Farmworker Series (2017) is one of Puerta's more recent projects. She uses paper making techniques to create vibrant tapestries which bring attention to farm workers on crops in the American south. Puerta weaves different materials in the tapestries, including lace, trims, sequined fabrics, velvet, handmade woven textile, pom-poms, fake fur, and gouache. Each piece also includes [renderings] of the flowers and leaves from the crops represented in each image, as well as, birds and insects as pollinators to these crops.

Selected exhibitions

Solo exhibitions
Lina Puerta: Tapestries, Smack Mellon, Brooklyn, NY, March 10 – April 22, 2018 
MANIGUA from the Botánico Series, a site-specific installation for The Miller Theatre at Columbia University in collaboration with The UPTOWN Triennale of the Wallach Art Gallery, August, July 17, 2017 - June 2018 
Within/Without, Geary Contemporary, NY, NY, February - March 2017 
Lina Puerta: TRACES, Jack Geary Contemporary, New York, NY February - April 2015 (Catalog) 
La Muerte de un Arbol (The Death of a Tree), Residency Exhibition, Materials for the Arts, LIC, NY Dec. 2014
Lina Puerta: Natura, The Sage Colleges: Opalka Gallery, Albany, NY August, 31 – October 2009 – (Catalog)

Selected group exhibitions
HyperAccumulators curated by Alexandra Rutsch Brock and Elizabeth Saperstein, Pelham Art Center, Pelham, NY January 18 - March 23, 2019 
Sedimentations: Assemblage as Social Repair, The 8th Floor, New York, NY, June 21 – December 8, 2018 
Living/Breathing, curated by Deanna Evans and Andrew Schwartz, Morgan Lehman 2, New York, NY June 21 – July 27, 2018 
Art, Artists & You, Children's Museum of Manhattan, New York, NY June 8 – December 31, 2018 
Labor & Materials, 21C Museum Hotels, Bentonville, AR, January – November, 2018 
Harlem Perspectives, Faction Art Projects, New York, NY, April 20 – May 13, 2018 
Site & Survey: The Architecture of Landscape. Patrick Van Caekenbergh, Hildur Ásgeirsdóttir Jónsson, Lina Puerta, Richmond Center for Visual Arts at Western Michigan University, Kalamazoo, MI, January 18 – March 11, 2018 
Dark and Stormy Night: The Gothic in Contemporary Art, Lehman College Art Gallery, Bronx, NY, October 28, 2017 - February 10, 2018 
"Nature is Back!" curated by Jodie DiNapoli, H Gallery, Paris, France. September 6 - October 7, 2017 
The 20th Anniversary Show, curated by Charlotta Kotik. Smack Mellon, Brooklyn, NY, November 12 – December 31, 2016 
"American Histories", curated by Alexandra Schwartz. PI Artworks, London, UK, November 18, 2016 – January 7, 2016
"RE – ArtPrize 8", The Fed Galleries at KCAD, Grand Rapids, MI, August 30 – October 15, 2016
"Field Studies", TSA, Bushwick, NY July–August, 2016 
"The (Not) So Secret Life of Plants", Paul Robeson Galleries, Rutgers, The State University of New Jersey, Newark, NJ August -December, 2015 
"Back to Eden: Contemporary Artists Wander the Garden" curated by Jennifer Scanlan, Museum of Biblical Art, NY June 27- September 28, 2014 (Catalog) 
"Eden" Odetta Gallery, Bushwick, NY July 5 – August 25, 2014 
"Barely There" curated by Vadis Turner, Jack Geary Contemporary, NY, NY June 26 – July 25, 2014 
"Mating Season" The Lodge Gallery, NY, NY June 5 – July 5, 2014 
"Prickly, Tender and Steamy: Artists in the Hothouse" Wave Hill, Bronx NY, April–May 2014 (Catalog)
"Select 2014" Washington Project for the Arts, Washington DC, February–March 2014

Awards
2016 ArtPrize Eight Sustainability Award, Grand Rapids, MI 
2017 NYFA Fellowship in the Crafts/Sculpture category, NY, NY

Selected Reviews, Articles and Publications 

The Brooklyn Rail, "Harlem Perspectives: Decolonizing the Gaze & Refiguring the Local " by Nico Wheadon, May 1, 2018.
Artmaze Mag, "Curated Section" Spring Edition, Issue 7, 2018.
Art News, "Dallas Art Fair Announces Acquisition Program for its Fellow Museum" by Robin Scher, April 14, 2016.
Hyperallergic, "Relics of a Future Environmental Collapse" by Benjamin Sutton April 1, 2015 (Solo Review).
 "Caribbean: Together Apart – Imago Mundi" Luciano Benetton Collection. Texts by Luciano Benetton, Rocío Aranda-Alvarado, Tony Bechara and Sasha Dees.
 Hyperallergic, "When Snakes Could Walk: Contemporary Artists Take On the Garden of Eden" by Allison Meier, July 7, 2014
ARTNET News, "You’ll Fall for ’Back to Eden’ at the Museum of Biblical Art" by Benjamin Sutton, August 5, 2014

References

External links 
 www.linapuerta.net

1969 births
Living people
American contemporary artists
21st-century American women artists
Colombian emigrants to the United States
Wells College alumni
Queens College, City University of New York alumni